HMS Holdings Corp. (Healthcare Management Systems) was founded in 1974 and is based in Irving, Texas. The company was formerly listed on Nasdaq but acquired by private-equity firm Veritas Capital in 2021.

Products and services 
The company's services include providing validated insurance and helping find liable third parties. Their program integrity services identify improper payments and over-payments and attempt recovery, as well as reduce fraud and waste. In addition, the company also supports Medicaid Managed Care Organizations and Medicare Advantage Plans.

Operations 
In April 2017, HMS Holdings acquired the Eliza Corporation, a privately held health engagement management and member analytics firm providing comprehensive and personalized member-centric outreach and engagement solutions, for a cash purchase price of $170 million.

In December 2012, HMS Holdings acquired the assets and liabilities of MedRecovery Management, LLC (MRM), for about $11.8 million, with $10.8 million initial cash payment and $1.0 million in future contingent payments.

In 2006, the Company announced to acquire the assets of PCG's Benefits Solutions Practice Area (BSPA) for $80 million in cash, shares of Holdings common stock and a contingent cash payment of up to $15 million.

Awards 
In February 2014, HMS Holdings’ Chief Security Officer Scott Pettigrew won the CSO Compass Awards by CSO magazine. Pettigrew has been working in Security for about twenty years and spent the last four years at HMS. He led the company’s first risk-based security program in 2010.In 2012 and 2013, HMS Holdings was included in the InformationWeek 500.In 2013, HMS Holdings was included on Modern Healthcare magazine's "Healthcare’s Hottest" list as one of the 40 fastest growing companies in healthcare.

References

External links 
 Official Website

American companies established in 1974
Business services companies of the United States
Business services companies established in 1974
Companies formerly listed on the Nasdaq
1974 establishments in Texas
2021 mergers and acquisitions
Companies based in Irving, Texas
Private equity portfolio companies